The Hütter Hü 17, is a German high-wing, strut-braced, single-seat, utility training glider that was designed by brothers Ulrich Hütter and Wolfgang Hütter in the 1930s.

The aircraft's correct designation is unclear and various sources refer to is as the Hütter Hü 17, Hütter-17, Hütter H-17, Hutter H-17, Hütter Hü-17, Göppingen Gö 5 and Goppingen 5.

Design and development
The Hütter brothers designed the Hü 17 in Salzburg, Austria, the designation indicating the aircraft's glide ratio. The design was made available as plans for amateur construction and several hundred were completed. The brothers then joined the Schempp-Hirth company which constructed about five of the aircraft under the designation Göppingen Gö 5.

The aircraft is of wooden construction, using a D-tube wing with a single strut and doped aircraft fabric covering. The wing employs a Göppingen 535 airfoil at the wing root and a NACA M-6 at the wing tip. The fuselage is plywood covered.

Operational history
In the 1980s a number of aircraft were still flying in Australia, West Germany, the United Kingdom and the United States. In July 2011 one example was registered with the American Federal Aviation Administration in the Experimental - Exhibition category, having been constructed in 1990.

Variants

Hü 17
Initial model with a  wing span
Hü 17B
Improved model, introduced after the Second World War with increased wing span and higher empty and gross weights
Göppingen Gö 5
Model built by Schempp-Hirth
TG-24
USAAF designation for one impressed Gö 5 (serial number 42-57185)
CAT 20
Italian licence build, 1938. Over 20 produced.

Aircraft on display
National Soaring Museum
Technisches Museum Wien

Specifications (Hü 17b)

See also

References

External links

1930s German sailplanes
Hütter aircraft